Dəymədağlı or Daymadagly or Deymedagyly may refer to:
Dəymədağlı, Oghuz, Azerbaijan
Dəymədağlı, Qakh, Azerbaijan